Grigore Obreja (November 6, 1967 – June 1, 2016) was a Romanian sprint canoeist who competed from the late 1980s to the late 1990s. Competing in two Summer Olympics, he won a bronze medal in the C-2 500 m event at Atlanta in 1996.

Obreja also won a gold in the C-2 500 m at the 1994 ICF Canoe Sprint World Championships in Mexico City.

References
DatabaseOlympics.com profile

1967 births
2016 deaths
Canoeists at the 1988 Summer Olympics
Canoeists at the 1996 Summer Olympics
Olympic canoeists of Romania
Olympic bronze medalists for Romania
Romanian male canoeists
Olympic medalists in canoeing
ICF Canoe Sprint World Championships medalists in Canadian

Medalists at the 1996 Summer Olympics